Zhangping railway station is a railway station in Zhangping, Longyan, Fujian, China. It formerly saw passenger services, but is now only used for freight.

History
A new station building was built and opened in 2007.

The final passenger service ran on 4 January 2019.

See also
Zhangping West railway station: a station on the Nanping–Longyan railway, opened on 29 December 2018

References

Railway stations in Fujian